Founded in 1902 by John Mitchell, Jr., Mechanics Savings Bank was a bank in the Jackson Ward neighborhood of Richmond, Virginia. Mitchell, who was an African American, also owned and edited the Richmond Planet.  In 1905 the bank bought a three-story brick building at No. 310 East Broad Street. The bank's Clay Street and Third building was designed by architect Carl Ruehrmund and constructed in 1910.  The bank was the chief depository of the Knights of Pythias. At the time of its failure in 1922, the bank had deposits totaling approximately $500,000.  In 1930, the Clay Street Building was purchased by the Southern Aid and Insurance Company.

References

Banks based in Virginia
Banks established in 1902
1902 establishments in Virginia
1922 disestablishments in Virginia
Companies based in Richmond, Virginia